Maurizio Trombetta (born 29 September 1962 in Udine) is an Italian former football player turned manager. He was head coach of Romanian Liga I clubs CFR Cluj and FCM Târgu Mureș and youth team coach at Reggina.

Career

Playing
A minor league player who played Serie A only in his first two professional seasons, respectively with Udinese and Catanzaro, he also played from 1989 to 1991 in Serie B with Triestina.

Coaching
Following his retirement as a player, Trombetta became Udinese's allievi (under-16) youth coach in 1994, being soon later appointed as Giovanni Galeone's assistant coach with the zebrette. He then followed Galeone to Perugia and Napoli before to return at Udine, this time as Francesco Guidolin's assistant coach. From 1999 to 2004 he then moved together with Guidolin at Bologna, working alongside him with the rossoblu.

In 2004, he returned to work alongside Galeone at Ancona, and followed his mentor when at Udinese in 2006–2007.

During the 2007–2008 he chose to start a coaching career of his own, becoming head coach of amateur Eccellenza club Sevegliano after league Week 7, with the team being at the bottom of the league table, and led them to an impressive fourth place.

In June 2008 he was appointed as new assistant coach of Romanian Liga I outgoing champions CFR Cluj, and was successively promoted as head coach later on September as a replacement for dismissed boss Ioan Andone. Under his tenure as CFR Cluj coach, the club is also competing for their first time ever in the UEFA Champions League as Romanian champions; in his first game in the top European competition, which came only fifteen days after his appointment as head coach, Trombetta's team won 2–1 at Stadio Olimpico to AS Roma thanks to two goals by Emmanuel Culio in a historical victory against the renowned giallorossi team, who were taking part to the UEFA Champions League as Serie A runners-up.

He was later dismissed in January 2009, after only four months in charge, leaving CFR Cluj in fourth place in the Liga I and only weeks after having been eliminated from the UEFA Champions League.

In February 2010 he was announced by Reggina as new head of the Primavera under-19 youth team, replacing Roberto Breda after he was promoted head coach days earlier.

In November 2011, he returned to Romania, signing a contract for a season with FCM Târgu Mureş. He was released only after a couple of months.

Coaching stats

References

1962 births
Living people
Sportspeople from Udine
Italian footballers
Italian football managers
CFR Cluj managers
ASA 2013 Târgu Mureș managers
U.S. Catanzaro 1929 players
Udinese Calcio players
U.S. Triestina Calcio 1918 players
S.P.A.L. players
U.S. Pistoiese 1921 players
Expatriate football managers in Romania
Association football fullbacks
Juventus F.C. non-playing staff
A.S.D. Sevegliano managers
Footballers from Friuli Venezia Giulia